Apsley House is the London townhouse of the Dukes of Wellington. It stands alone at Hyde Park Corner, on the south-east corner of Hyde Park, facing south towards the busy traffic roundabout in the centre of which stands the Wellington Arch. It is a Grade I listed building.

It is sometimes referred to as the Wellington Museum, its official designation under a 1947 Act of Parliament. The house is now run by English Heritage and is open to the public as a museum and art gallery, exhibiting the Wellington Collection, a large collection of paintings, other artworks and memorabilia of the career of the 1st Duke. The 9th Duke of Wellington retains the use of part of the buildings. It is perhaps the only preserved example of an English aristocratic townhouse from its period. The practice has been to maintain the rooms as far as possible in the original style and decor.

History
Apsley House stands at the site of an old lodge that belonged to the crown. During the Interregnum newer buildings were erected between what is now Old Park Lane and Hyde Park Corner. In the 1600s after the Restoration they were leased by James Hamilton (died 1673) and renewed by Elizabeth his widow in 1692 on a 99-year lease (Hamilton Place takes its name from that family). Immediately before Apsley House was built the site was occupied by a tavern called the Hercules Pillars (immortalised by Henry Fielding in The History of Tom Jones, a Foundling as the location where Squire Western resides when he first journeys up to London).

The house was originally built in red brick by Robert Adam between 1771 and 1778 for Lord Apsley, the Lord Chancellor, who gave the house its name. Some Adam interiors survive: the Piccadilly Drawing Room with its apsidal end and Adam fireplace, and the Portico Room, behind the giant Corinthian portico added by Wellington.

The house was given the popular nickname of Number One, London, since it was the first house passed by visitors who travelled from the countryside after the toll gates at Knightsbridge. It was originally part of a contiguous line of great houses on Piccadilly, demolished to widen Park Lane: its official address remains 149 Piccadilly, W1J 7NT.

In 1807 the house was purchased by Richard Wellesley, 1st Marquess Wellesley, the elder brother of Sir Arthur Wellesley, but in 1817 financial difficulties forced him to sell it to his famous brother, by then the Duke of Wellington, who needed a London base from which to pursue his new career in politics.

Wellington employed the architect Benjamin Dean Wyatt to carry out renovations in two phases: in the first, begun in 1819, he added a three-storey extension to the north east, housing a State Dining Room, bedrooms and dressing rooms. The scagliola ornamentations, that resemble marble inlays, were produced in Coade stone from the Coade Ornamental Stone Manufactory in Lambeth.

The second phase, started after Wellington had become Prime Minister in 1828, included a new staircase and the "Waterloo Gallery" on the west side of the house. The red-brick exterior was clad in Bath stone, and a pedimented portico added. Wyatt's original estimate for the work was £23,000, but the need to repair structural defects discovered during the work led to costs escalating to more than £61,000. Wyatt introduced his own version of French style to the interior, notably in the Waterloo Gallery and the florid wrought iron stair-rail, described by Pevsner as "just turning from Empire to a neo-Rococo".

The Waterloo Gallery is named after the Duke's famous victory over Napoleon at the Battle of Waterloo. The Waterloo Banquet was held annually to commemorate the famous victory of 18 June 1815. The first banquets were held in the Dining Room but in 1828 when Wyatt completed the Waterloo Gallery the banquet was moved there and became a much larger event, seating 74 as opposed to 36 in the dining room. The Duke's equestrian statue can be seen across the busy road, cloaked and watchful, the plinth guarded at each corner by an infantryman. This statue was cast from guns captured at the battle.

Gerald Wellesley, 7th Duke of Wellington, gave the house and its most important contents to the nation in 1947, but by the Wellington Museum Act 1947 the right of the family to occupy just over half the house was preserved "so long as there is a Duke of Wellington". The family apartments are now on the north side of the house, concentrated on the second floor.

Gallery

See also
List of monuments to Arthur Wellesley, 1st Duke of Wellington
Stratfield Saye House – the country home of the Dukes of Wellington
Walmer Castle – the residence of the 1st Duke as Lord Warden of the Cinque Ports
Waterloo ceremony
Wellington Museum, Somerset
Wellington Museum, Waterloo

Additional reading
Jervis, Simon & Tomlin, Maurice (revised by Voak, Jonathon; 1984, revisions 1989 & 1995) Apsley House Wellington Museum published by the Trustees of the Victoria and Albert Museum, London 
Nikolaus Pevsner, The Buildings of England: London vol. I, p. 463.

References

External links
 

Apsley House – English Heritage website
Historical Images of Apsley House
Apsley House and Park Lane, Old and New London: Volume 4 (1878), pp. 359–375

Art museums and galleries in London
Biographical museums in London
Historic house museums in London
Houses in the City of Westminster
Museums in the City of Westminster
English Heritage sites in London
Grade I listed houses in London
Grade I listed buildings in the City of Westminster
Grade I listed museum buildings
Arthur Wellesley, 1st Duke of Wellington
Bathurst family
Prime ministerial homes in the United Kingdom
Robert Adam buildings
Georgian architecture in the City of Westminster
Greek Revival houses in the United Kingdom
Neoclassical architecture in London